The 58th New Brunswick Legislative Assembly was created following a general election in 2014 and dissolved on August 23, 2018 for the new general election.

Leadership
Lieutenant Governor Jocelyne Roy-Vienneau was installed October 23, 2014.

Speaker Chris Collins was elected October 24, 2014 and served for the duration of the legislature.

Premier of New Brunswick Brian Gallant (Liberal) led the Government for the duration of the legislature.

Leader of the Opposition Blaine Higgs (Progressive Conservative) led the Official Opposition from fall 2016 until the end of the legislature.  Higgs was preceded by the interim leader of his party Bruce Fitch.

History

On 1 December 2015, the Gallant government opened the legislature's second session with a promise to "get tough" on the province's tattered finances. The speech from the throne documented how the province had accumulated a debt of $12.4 billion by failing to produce a balanced budget since 2007. The province spent more on interest payments than it did on post-secondary education, and the consultation of citizens called the "Strategic Program Review" had all but concluded. The province said its credit rating was at risk, and the costs to service the debt if the rating were downgraded would then rise.  The projected deficit for the 2015–16 budget was at the time $453 million. A report issued the previous Friday had calculated at $300 million the benefit to the government of a two-percent rise of the harmonized sales tax (HST) from 13% to 15%.

On 2 December 2015, it was brought to light that the province's Chief Medical Officer of Health Dr. Eilish Cleary had been obliged by her Deputy Minister to go "on leave". She said she was not allowed to discuss the reasons for the leave. "I was surprised and upset when it happened. The whole situation has caused me significant stress and anxiety. And not being able to talk about it makes it worse." Her office had been "developing a plan to further explore" the carcinogenic effects of glyphosate, a substance which was found earlier in 2015 to be "probably carcinogenic to humans" by the International Agency for Research on Cancer, a branch of the World Health Organization, and which is utilized in New Brunswick by forestry company J.D. Irving Ltd. and by NB Power, a provincial Crown corporation. Victor Boudreau, the Minister of Health at the time, told reporters Cleary's leave was "a personnel matter. It's not something we can comment about. It has nothing to do with the office per se, or the independence of the office. It's an HR issue and I won't comment anymore." The next day, the Deputy Minister of Health, Tom Maston, rejected suggestions that Cleary was being silenced, and the Minister of Environment was questioned on the matter in the legislature. The leader of the opposition said that there was a "disturbing" trend of the Gallant Liberals trying to silence independent watchdogs, and pointed to the ruling party's recent feud with the Auditor-General and failure to appoint a new conflict of interest commissioner for six months. On 7 December, Cleary—who had been removed from her office on 2 November—stated in an e-mail that she had been fired by the provincial government without cause: "I can confirm that my employment as Chief Medical Officer has been terminated without cause effective immediately." The government did not respond to requests for information, while various opposition politicians made hay and a public protest ensued in support of Cleary. The next day, the Liberal government was grilled in question period. The Minister of Health maintained that the termination without cause was due to a personnel matter, while Cleary maintained that she was never told what the personnel issues were. On 15 January 2016, Cleary and her employer of nine years reached a settlement, which was not disclosed to the public. A statement was released, that "Dr. Cleary and the Department of Health have concluded a satisfactory agreement consistent with common law termination without cause principles."

In their 2016 budget, presented by Finance Minister Roger Melanson on 2 February 2016, the Liberal party increased, as forecast the previous December, the HST from 13% to 15%, effective 1 July 2016.

Cathy Rogers became the first female finance minister of the province in a cabinet shuffle that occurred on 6 June 2016. As well, Lisa Harris was appointed minister of Celtic affairs, a newly established cabinet post. Francine Landry continued as Minister for La Francophonie, while Victor Boudreau continued as Minister of Health. Brian Kenny replaced Serge Rousselle as the education minister, while the latter takes over at Environment and Local Government. Rousselle, who remains in post as Attorney-General, is the only lawyer in cabinet, apart from Gallant.

Rogers was only in her second week in post when the Canada Pension Plan (CPP) file exploded into acrimony. On 20 June 2016, Federal Minister of Finance Bill Morneau and eight of his provincial colleagues announced jointly that the CPP would become more expensive.  The announcement was hailed as Ontario premier Kathleen Wynne's victory, since it would allow her to cancel the new provincial plan on which she had campaigned. The increase by one percentage point to 5.95 per cent of wages shall take place from 2019 to 2025. Rogers was pilloried in the provincial press and earned the ire of the Coalition of New Brunswick Employers, an alliance of 25 industry associations employing about two-thirds of the province's private-sector workforce.

On 2 November 2016, the Gallant government issued a speech from the Throne, its second in a year, and said that its contentious amendment to the Judicature Act, which would give to the government the power of veto over certain personnel decisions that theretofore had lain with the Chief Justice of the Queen's Bench, was to be revived. It had been allowed to fall off the order paper when the legislature wrapped up without its passage. Chief Justice David Smith earlier had challenged the authority of the Premier to implement his plan.

The Gallant government raised the ire of senior citizens with its plans to require access to confidential Revenue Canada files in exchange for those who sought social assistance. Cecile Cassista, the executive director of the Coalition for Seniors and Nursing Home Residents, saw it as "nothing more than another attempt by government to grab seniors' assets". Two days later, the Gallant government, in the person of Stephen Horsman, climbed down and pledged to rewrite the legislation.

Members
Most of the current members were elected at the general election on September 22, 2014, Progressive Conservative Glen Savoie was elected at a November 17, 2014 by-election.

Standings changes in the 58th Assembly

See also
2010 New Brunswick general election
2014 New Brunswick general election
Legislative Assembly of New Brunswick

References

Terms of the New Brunswick Legislature
2014 establishments in Canada
21st century in New Brunswick
2018 disestablishments in New Brunswick